Karin (also Romanized as Karīn; also known as Karan-e Bozorg) is a village in Palanga Rural District, Shahrud District, Khalkhal County, Ardabil Province, Iran. At the 2006 census, its population was 539, in 153 families.

References 

Tageo

Towns and villages in Khalkhal County